Chris Saunders may refer to:

Chris Saunders (headmaster) (born 1940), English former headmaster and first-class cricketer
Chris Saunders (boxer) (born 1969), British former boxer, British welterweight champion between 1995 and 1996
Chris Saunders (mixed martial artist) (born 1986), American fighter
Chris Saunders, musician with Nigel Durham
Chris Saunders, creator of Lola T95/30

See also
Chris Sanders (disambiguation)